Flowers & Butterflies is a Burmese romantic comedy-drama television series. Season 1 aired on Channel 7, from March 18 to June 7, 2013, on Mondays to Fridays at 17:15 for 60 episodes. Season 2 aired on MRTV-4, from October 15 to November 20, 2015, on Mondays to Fridays at 19:15 for 27 episodes.

Its season 1 aired from March 11 to May 31, 2013 and its season 2 aired from October 8 to November 13, 2015, on Mondays to Fridays at 06:00, on For Comedy Channel, channel from 4TV Network.

Cast
Kyi Zaw Htet as Khant Htal Wah
Khay Sett Thwin as Thadar
Nat Khat as Kaung Htet Yan
Khin Sandar Myint as May
Kyaw Htet as Ye Yint Thu
Khine Thazin Oo as Sakura
Sai Nay Phyo as Htut Htake
Eaindray Wint Htal as Yu Ya Khin
Kyaw Hsu as Nay Kyar
Soe Nandar Kyaw as Nyo Mi
Myat Thu Thu as Rose Angel
Zu Zu Zan as May Myint Mo

References

Burmese television series
Channel 7 (Myanmar) original programming